Bâlea Lake ( or Bâlea Lac,) is a glacier lake situated at 2,034 m of altitude in the Făgăraș Mountains, in central Romania, in Cârțișoara, Sibiu County. There are two chalets opened all the year round, a meteorological station and a mountain rescue (Salvamont) station. It is accessible by car on the Transfăgărășan road during the summer, and the rest of the year by a cable car from the "Bâlea Cascadă" chalet.

On 17 April 1977. an avalanche killed 23 skiers gathered near the lake; 19 of those were high school students from the Samuel von Brukenthal National College in Sibiu. This was the deadliest avalanche ever in Romania, with the 42nd highest death toll in the world.

In 2006, the first ice hotel in Eastern Europe was built in the vicinity of the lake. The hotel has opened for 15 years since then, but not during the 2019–2020 season, due to higher than usual temperatures.

References

External links
 

Lakes of Sibiu County